Sofija Skorić is a Serbian Canadian writer, editor, translator, publisher, activist and initiator-founder of The Serbian Heritage Academy of Canada, based in Toronto.

Biography

She came to Canada at an early age to take her post-graduate degrees in Library Science and become one of the principal librarians at Robarts Library of the University of Toronto, retiring as librarian emerita.

Skorić concerns herself with three main fields of inquiry—the interrelations of philosophy and science, the philosophy of law, and the social and political problems of the Serbs. She edited some of the books of George Vid Tomashevich, Danko Popović, Meša Selimović, Dushan R. Kosovich, Vasa D. Mihailovich; wrote several comprehensive chapters in the East European Quarterly, Serbian Studies and other learned Slavic periodicals; and translated Epiphany by Matija Bećković, the poet laureate of Serbia. She also served as president of The North American Society for Serbian Studies, president of the Serbian-Canadian Unity Congress, and vice-president of the Serbian Unity Congress.

Skorić's eminence among her contemporary Serbian writers was not generally recognized until the appearance of the "Serbs in Ontario", "Serbian Academy After A Century: An Institution at Risk" (see Source at Memorandum SANU), "Stress In the Vortex of Global Anomie", "Dream and Shadows", "A World As A Metaphor", "The Bloodblossoms of Kossovo: A Chronicle About the Serbian Holy Land", "Jewish Portraits in the Work of Ivo Andrić", and many other titles.

Her earlier work in publishing received recognition of the Canadian and Serbian governments alike and 2004 The Karić Brothers Award, but it was her determination to initiate and found the Serbian Heritage Academy of Canada which established her position in the front rank of the Serbian activists in Canada.

The Serbian Heritage Academy

The Serbian Heritage Academy of Canada has been active ever since its founding. The academy invites scholars, authors, and speakers on various subjects pertaining to Serbian society in general and culture in particular, in the past and present, and across all fields and disciplines.

Founded in 1981, to act as a central cultural institution within the Serbian Diaspora in Canada, supporting preservation and development of Serbian language, education, literature, history, music, folklore, including all other activities in the social sciences field in connection with Serbian cultural heritage; it collects, archives and offers to the public all available written materials from history and culture of the Serbian nation.

The Serbian Heritage Academy is the result of lengthy and careful evolution. Its development began in the late 1970s with a working group of Serbian intellectuals in Toronto, Canada; it concluded with the founding of the Academy by librarian Sofija Skorić of the University of Toronto who initiated and spearheaded completion. Supporting her efforts were lawyer Nikola Pašić, the grandson of World War I statesman by the same name; art historian Dušan Bijelić, civil engineer Nikola Alexeichenko and teacher and vice-principal Paul Pavlovich. In 1980 others joined the Board, including Mrs. Rosa Somborac, Gojko Protich, Nikola Bogdanovich, and Michael (Mihailo) Petrovich at the time of its incorporation as the Serbian Heritage Academy of Canada in 1981. Then came Jana Dzeletović, Rade Dodić, Dr. Žika Davidovac, Mirijana Simić, Jelena Petričić, Braca Divić, Dr. Velimir Ristić, Nada Stegnajic, Gordana Tomić, Dragan Todorović (known as Charles Todd).

With her vision of an academy, Sofija Škorić aimed for a clearly defined goal: with the help of a close-meshed network of Serbian historians, scientists, professors, writers, poets, and artists, the problems and questions facing the Serbian nation in the Balkans should be examined from different perspectives and ultimately answered. The Serbian Heritage Academy in Toronto and Hamilton had a total of 14 chapters in fourteen cities in North America at the height of their activity. The guests of the academy were invited speakers in all the SHA chapters.

Recently, president Žarko Brestovac and past president Sofia Šlorić of the Serbian Heritage Academy of Canada, and president Dragan Stanić of Matica srpska signed a cooperative agreement between the two institutions at the University of Toronto. Both institutions will be cooperating on publishing projects.

Works
Serbs in Ontario (1987)
The Serbian Academy after a century: an institution at risk? (1987)
Serbia 1914-1918: A Gallant Ally (2014)

References
 Serbian Heritage Academy: http://www.serbianheritageacademyofcanada.ca/sha-history.html

External links

Canadian people of Serbian descent
Canadian women non-fiction writers
Serbian women writers
Year of birth missing (living people)
Living people
21st-century Canadian women writers
21st-century Canadian non-fiction writers